"I've Got a Little Something for You" is a song by British R&B group MN8. It was released on 23 January 1995 as the lead single from their debut album, To the Next Level (1995). The song was written by Mark Taylor and Denis Ingoldsby and was produced by Dennis Charles and Ronnie Wilson. It peaked at number two on the UK Singles Chart, reached number three in France and New Zealand, and charted within the top 10 in eight other territories, including Australia, Ireland, Norway, and the Wallonia region of Belgium.

Critical reception
Gil Robertson IV from Cash Box wrote, "This sexy and hard-groove track from MN8’s upcoming debut has all the right grooves to make this group a favorite of the urban set. Radio will find this track immediately accessible. The vocals are clean and the music is some of the best that I’ve heard in a long time." James Masterton said in his weekly UK chart commentary, "The biggest new hit of the week comes seemingly from nowhere. A clever programme of promotional appearances from the latest batch of young swingbeaters gives MN8 the momentum they need to crash straight into the Top 10 with their first ever hit." He also complimented the "radio-friendly nature" of the track.

Track listings
 7-inch and CD single
 "I've Got a Little Something for You" (radio version) – 3:43
 "I've Got a Little Something for You" (Bad Boy Stripped Down mix) – 4:18

 Maxi-CD and 12-inch maxi
 "I've Got a Little Something for You" (radio version) – 3:43
 "I've Got a Little Something for You" (Bad Boy Stripped Down vocal mix) – 4:18
 "I've Got a Little Something for You" (West End mix) – 5:21
 "I've Got a Little Something for You" (West End dub) – 5:19

 12-inch maxi – Remixes
 "I've Got a Little Something for You" (Tee's original club mix) – 5:41
 "I've Got a Little Something for You" (Club Float Mix edit) – 5:45
 "I've Got a Little Something for You" (Player's Club Mix edit) – 6:02
 "I've Got a Little Something for You" (Tee's original instrumental) – 5:18
 "I've Got a Little Something for You" (Float instrumental) – 5:49
 "I've Got a Little Something for You" (Player's instrumental) – 5:49

Charts and certifications

Weekly charts

Year-end charts

Certifications

Release history

References

1994 songs
1995 debut singles
Columbia Records singles
First Avenue Records singles
MN8 songs
Songs written by Denis Ingoldsby
Songs written by Mark Taylor (record producer)